Doliolomyia is a genus of parasitic flies in the family Tachinidae.

Species
Doliolomyia alactaga Reinhard, 1975
Doliolomyia thessa Reinhard, 1975

Distribution
Mexico.

References

Diptera of North America
Dexiinae
Tachinidae genera